This is a list of countries by exports of goods and services per capita. Unless otherwise stated, all data is based on the information in the Economic Complexity Index.

References

Lists of countries by product exports
Lists of countries by per capita values